Brachmia monotona is a moth in the family Gelechiidae. It was described by Aristide Caradja in 1927. It is found in China.

References

Moths described in 1927
Brachmia
Moths of Asia